Scott Fava (born 19 January 1976 in Kiama, Australia) is an Australian retired rugby union footballer.

Super 14
Scott Fava began his Super Rugby career with the Queensland Reds in 1999, playing for three seasons before moving on to the ACT Brumbies. At the Brumbies, Fava was named Best Forward in 2004.

For the 2006 season, Fava joined the new Western Force side which were part of the expansion of the Super 12 to become the Super 14.  During the season, Fava was relegated to the bench after failing a club alcohol breath test.  Fava made 87 appearances in Super Rugby.

He later became the first person to play for all Australian Super 14 sides when he joined the Waratahs. He later retired due to injury after the 2009 season.

Fava played for Eastwood and became the first person to win the Ken Catchpole Medal three times, voted as the most outstanding player in the Sydney club competition in 2002, 2003 and 2004.

Tests
Fava made his test debut for the Wallabies against England in 2005 and was also part of the tour party in France. He scored his first test try in the 2006 Tri Nations-Bledisloe Cup tie against the All Blacks.

Commonwealth games
Scott Fava was a member of the Australian Rugby 7's side at the 2006 Commonwealth Games that lost out in the bronze medal playoff against Fiji. During the match, Fava suffered a sickening hit in a collision with Viliame Satala and began convulsing on the field. He was able to make a full recovery after being taken to the Royal Melbourne Hospital.

References

External links
Western Force profile
Player profile
BBC on Commonwealth Rugby 7's
Benching following breath test

1976 births
Living people
Australian rugby union players
Australia international rugby union players
ACT Brumbies players
Western Force players
New South Wales Waratahs players
Queensland Reds players
Rugby union number eights
Rugby sevens players at the 2006 Commonwealth Games
Male rugby sevens players
Australia international rugby sevens players
Commonwealth Games rugby sevens players of Australia
Rugby union players from New South Wales